Calendion (also, Calandion or Callandion) was the Patriarch of Antioch between 479 and 485.

Biography
Calendion supported the results of the Council of Chalcedon, but refused to accept the Henotikon of 482, through which the Byzantine Emperor, Zeno, attempted to reconcile the pro- and anti-Chalcedonian sides. This was because Calendion regarded it as a covert attempt to overturn the council's holdings.

Calendion supported the rebellion of Illus in 484, and as a result was deposed and banished by Zeno shortly thereafter, being replaced as Patriarch by Peter II.

References

Sources 
 
 

Patriarchs of Antioch
5th-century Byzantine bishops
5th-century archbishops
Year of birth unknown
Year of death unknown